Ali ibn Yusuf ibn Umar was the sixth Emir of Crete, reigning from .

The surviving records on the internal history and rulers of the Emirate of Crete are very fragmentary. He is tentatively identified as a son of the fifth emir, Yusuf, and the great-grandson of the conqueror of Crete and founder of the emirate, Abu Hafs Umar.

He is probably the unnamed emir of Crete mentioned in a story about the abduction of a number of prisoners from Nauplion by Cretan pirates ; the bishop Peter of Argos prayed for their deliverance, and an Imperial galley caught the pirates, immobilized them with Greek fire, and returned the captives to their homes. His name is only attested through coinage.

He was succeeded by his uncle, Ahmad ibn Umar.

References

Sources
 
 
 

10th-century Arabs
10th-century rulers in Europe
Emirs of Crete
Arab people of the Arab–Byzantine wars
People from Crete